Jeremy Joseph Gable (born May 10, 1982) is a British-born American playwright and game designer living in Philadelphia.

Early life
Gable was born in Lakenheath, Suffolk, England. He grew up in Post Falls, Idaho, then moved to Barstow, California after graduation.

Career
In July 2006, Gable wrote and produced Giant Green Lizard! The Musical, a musical parody of the Japanese monster movies from the 1950s, for the Maverick Theater Company in Fullerton, California. The show received a positive notice in the entertainment trade BackStage West, particularly noting its "inventive score" and "off-kilter sensibility".

Gable served as Artistic Director of the Hunger Artists Theatre Company from December 2006 to April 2009 where he directed the Orange County premieres of Sarah Kane's 4.48 Psychosis and Bryony Lavery's Frozen, as well as writing the Flying Spaghetti Monster plays, which were covered by the official Flying Spaghetti Monster website. He also wrote American Way, which made its premiere at Los Angeles' Blank Theatre,  - and 140: A Twitter Performance, the first documented full-length fully original Twitter play. He was named "one of Orange County's most genuinely innovative theatrical minds" by OC Weekly and called "one of O.C.'s more fertile theatrical minds" by the Orange County Register.

After moving to Philadelphia, Gable wrote another Twitter play, The 15th Line, as well as the stage plays D-Pad, which was a finalist for the Eugene O'Neill Theater Center's National Playwrights Conference, and Go Ahead, which was presented at the National New Play Network's National Showcase of New Plays.

In 2018, Gable adapted his play Watch Me Jump into a video game, which was made available for PC, Mac, iOS, and Android. The game was nominated for an Independent Games Festival Award for Excellence in Narrative.

Gable is a co-founder of the feminist performance platform Ninth Planet.

2020 presidential campaign
In 2015, Gable submitted paperwork declaring an Independent presidential run in 2020. He terminated his candidacy in 2017.

Produced and published works

Stage

Video games

See also
 List of playwrights
 List of people from Philadelphia, Pennsylvania
 List of people from Fullerton, California
 List of people from Idaho

References

External links
Jeremy Gable's Official Website

1982 births
Living people
21st-century American dramatists and playwrights
People from Lakenheath
People from Fullerton, California
Writers from Philadelphia
People from Post Falls, Idaho
People from Barstow, California
American video game designers
Video game writers
Candidates in the 2020 United States presidential election